Lucas Lingman (born 25 January 1998) is a Finnish footballer who plays as an midfielder for HJK, on loan from Helsingborg.

Career
Lingman began his career as a youth with Honka before joining HJK in 2011. He was promoted to the first team in 2015, and made his Veikkausliiga debut on 30 August 2015 against FC Ilves at the age of 17. 

2018 Lingman signed 1+2 year(s) contract (with the team having the right to extend it) with Rovaniemen Palloseura.

On 28 October 2019, HJK announced the signing of Lingman on a two-year contract, with the option of an additional year.

On 18 January 2022, he signed with Helsingborg in Sweden.

References

External links

Lucas Lingman at Rovaniemen Palloseura

1998 births
Footballers from Espoo
Living people
Finnish footballers
Finland youth international footballers
Association football midfielders
Klubi 04 players
Rovaniemen Palloseura players
Helsingin Jalkapalloklubi players
Helsingborgs IF players
Veikkausliiga players
Kakkonen players
Finnish expatriate footballers
Expatriate footballers in Sweden
Finnish expatriate sportspeople in Sweden
Finnish people of Swedish descent